James Piers St Aubyn (6 April 1815 – 8 May 1895), often referred to as J P St Aubyn, was an English architect of the Victorian era, known for his church architecture and confident restorations.

Early life
St Aubyn was born at Powick Vicarage, Worcestershire, in the English Midlands, the home of his maternal grandfather, on 6 April 1815. He was the second son of the Rev Robert Thomas St Aubyn and his wife, Frances Fleming St John, and a cousin of John St Aubyn, 1st Baron St Levan, of St Michael's Mount, Cornwall. He was known to his family and friends by his second Christian name of Piers (sometimes spelt Pearse). He was educated at Penzance Grammar School before beginning his studies in architecture.

He married Eliza Phillpott in 1852 at Stoke Damerel, Devon. Eliza was born in Ceylon in 1816 and died on 13 September 1881 at their home, 108 Cambridge Street, Hanover Square, London.

Career
He was articled to Thomas Fulljames (1808–1874) in Gloucester and acted as clerk of works for the latter's Edwards College, South Cerney (Glos) in 1838–39. He was elected to the Royal Institute of British Architects in 1837, on the nomination of George Basevi, Edward Blore and William Railton, and became a Fellow of the Institute in 1856, proposed by Benjamin Ferrey, Giles Gilbert Scott, and Francis Penrose. He twice served on the Council of the Institute (in 1858–60 and 1870–72). He was Surveyor to the Middle Temple in London from 1851 until 1885, and practised from Lambe Buildings in the Temple for much of his career. From about 1885 onwards, when he seems to have semi-retired, St. Aubyn worked in partnership with Henry John Wadling (d 1918), who entered his office as a pupil in 1858 and remained as his assistant and managing clerk. St Aubyn died on 7 May 1895 at Chy-an-Eglos, Marazion (Cornwall), and is buried on St Michael's Mount. H J Wadling succeeded to his practice, and continued to trade as "St Aubyn & Wadling".

St Aubyn was undoubtedly assisted in developing his career by his family's prominence in Devon and Cornwall, and particularly in Devonport, where they were the major landowners. He practised chiefly in London and developed a practice which extended all over southern England, but he also kept an office in Devonport for part of his career, and he was employed particularly extensively in Devon and Cornwall. Apart from this local connection, there are clusters of his work in Gloucestershire (no doubt deriving from his years in Fulljames' office), Kent, Reading, Cambridgeshire and Leicestershire.

He was primarily a church architect, building a considerable number of new churches and undertaking even more restorations. His church work was firmly in the Gothic revival mainstream of his time, rarely departing from the forms and decoration of the Decorated period, and lacks much originality or flair. His churches at All Saints, Reading and St Mary, Tyndalls Park, Bristol, are notably similar. His restorations often amounted to wholesale or partial rebuilding, and were seen by later generations as unnecessarily brutal; Sir John Betjeman was among St Aubyn's 20th-century detractors. St Aubyn also designed a number of country houses, mostly in a rather cheerless early Gothic style. The one whimsical building he is known to have designed is the clock tower in the grounds of Abberley Hall, c 1883. His greatest professional disappointment was his failure to secure the commission to build Truro Cathedral, which he lost by one vote to John Loughborough Pearson; his designs for the Cathedral were published in Building News, 20 December 1878. His most notable achievement was the restoration of St Michael's Mount, described by Nigel Nicolson as: "among the greatest achievements of 19th-century architecture".

List of works

1840s

Berkeley Cottages, Collingwood Road, Stoke Dameral, Plymouth: 1847
St Illogan's Church, Illogan, Cornwall: 1846
Old Rectory, Siddington, Gloucestershire: 1847
Holy Trinity Church, Cerney Wick, Gloucestershire: 1847–48
Church of St Agnes, St Agnes, Cornwall: 1848
Old Rectory, Stoke Canon, Devon: 1848–51
St Paul's Church, Devonport, Devon: 1849; destroyed by enemy action, 1941
St John the Baptist Church, Godolphin Cross, Cornwall: 1849–51
St James the Great Church, Keyham, Devon: 1849–51; damaged by enemy action, 1941; demolished 1958

1850s

St Michael's Mount, Cornwall: addition to South Court, for Sir J St Aubyn, 1850
St Mary's Church, Devonport, Devon: 1850
Vicarage, Horsley, Gloucestershire: 1850–52; altered by A W Maberly, 1874
St Stephen's Church, Devonport, Devon: 1852
Market House, Devonport, Devon: 1852
Holy Trinity Church, Penponds, Cornwall: 1854
St James the Less Church, Plymouth, Devon: 1854–61
St John's Church, Enfield, Middlesex: 1857
Christ Church, Latchingdon, Essex: 1857
Delamore House, Devon: for Admiral George Parker, 1859–60 and 1876

1860s

All Saints Church, Marazion, Cornwall: 1861
Middle Temple, London: Goldsmith's Building, 1861
St Martin and St Meriadoc’s Church, Camborne: restoration,1861–62
Temple Church, London: restoration, 1862
St Andrew's Church, Thringstone, Leicestershire: 1862
St Mary's Church, Widford, Essex: 1862
Church of All Hallows, South Cerney, Gloucestershire: 1862
Pentre, Pembrokeshire: remodelling for Col A H Saunders-Davies at a cost of £5,000, 1863; mostly demolished; service wing survives
St Bartholomew's Church, Cross-in-Hand, Sussex: 1863–64; enlarged 1901
Midelney Place, Somerset: for E B Cely-Trevilian, 1863–66
Trevince House, Cornwall: rebuilt for Henry Beauchamp Tucker, 1863–66
Haddington Road Bible Christian Chapel, Devonport, Devon: 1864
St Mark's Church, Gillingham, Kent: 1864–6
Berkley Rectory, Berkley Nr Frome, Somerset: extension,1865
The Abbey, Ditcheat, Somerset: attributed: refronting and internal alterations for Rev William Leir, 1864–68
St Stephen's Church, Redruth, Cornwall: 1865
St Peter's Church, Selsey, Sussex: 1865
Holy Innocents Church, Tuck Hill, Shropshire: 1865
All Saints Church, Reading, Berkshire: 1865–74
St John the Evangelist Church, St Ives, Cornwall: 1866
Holy Trinity, Ashby-de-la-Zouch, Leicestershire: addition of chancel, 1866
Holy Trinity Church, Barkingside, Middlesex: 1867
St Clement Church, Kensington, Middlesex: 1867–69
St Mary, Kilmington, Wiltshire: addition of N aisle and S transept, 1868

1870s

All Saints Church, Harrowbarrow, Cornwall, 1870
 Puddleduck Hall, Hardwicke, Gloucestershire: formerly known as Glebe House, 1870
 St Materiana's Church, Tintagel, Cornwall: 1870
 St Mary the Virgin Church, Tyndalls Park, Bristol: 1870–81, notably similar to All Saints, Reading
Chapel, Maristow, Devon: 1871
 Greenhurst, Surrey: for Thomas Lambert, 1871–74
Chalcot House, Dilton Marsh, Wiltshire, alterations and extensions, 1872–76
Loggia, Mersham-Le-Hatch, Kent: 1872
St Michael and All Angels Church, Galleywood Common, Essex: 1873
St Giles' Church, Reading, Berkshire: rebuilding, 1873
St Mary's and St Julian's Church, Maker, Cornwall: restoration and addition of south aisle, 1873–74
St Michael's Mount, Cornwall: addition of southeast wing for Sir J St  Aubyn, 1874–80; further extended c 1930
St Peter's Church, Belsize Park, Middlesex: addition of chancel and tower, 1875
St Luke's Church, Southampton, Hampshire: chancel, 1875
St Giles' Church, Marston Montgomery, Derbyshire: nave, 1875–77
St Andrew's Church, Ampthill, Bedfordshire: alterations, 1877
St Peter and St Paul's Church, Clare, Suffolk: 1877–1883 
Vicarage, Clare, Suffolk: 1878
St Helen's Church, Ashby-de-la-Zouch: rebuilt, 1878
St Martin and St Meriadoc’s Church, Camborne: enlargement 1878–79 
Truro Cathedral, Truro, Cornwall: surveys of former St Mary’s church and competition designs (unexecuted), 1878–80
Pentre, Pembrokeshire: private chapel as memorial to A H Saunders-Davies, 1879; the font and pulpit now at Manordeifi church
Rousham House, Oxfordshire: extension and restoration for Clement Upton-Cottrell-Dormer, 1870s
St Mawnan and St Stephen's Church, Mawnan restoration 1879–80

1880s

Essex Street; no 33, Westminster, Middlesex: 1880, built in imitation of a house of c 1720
St Peter's Church, Noss Mayo, Devon: 1880–82, as replacement for Revelstoke church
St Andrew's Church, Eakring 1880–1881, restoration
Church of St Mary the Virgin, Gamlingay, Cambridgeshire, 1880 restoration
Theological College, Ely, Cambridgeshire: 1881, now part of King's School
Pencalenick House, Truro, Cornwall: 1881
St John's Church, Aylesbury, Buckinghamshire: 1881–83
Middle Temple, London: new chambers on north side of Brick Court, 1882, Tudor; altered c.1950 after bomb damage
St Luke's Church, Reading, Berkshire: 1882
Church, St Gluvias, Cornwall: 1882–83
St Peter's Church, Rose Ash, Devon: 1882–92 (with Wadling)
Abberley Hall, Worcestershire: alterations and clock tower for John Joseph Jones, c.1883
Oakhampton House, Worcestershire: remodelling for John Henry Crane, 1883
Mission Church, Ashton, Cornwall: 1884
St Michael's Church, Silverstone, Northamptonshire: 1884
Middle Temple, London: Garden Court, 1884–85, neo-Jacobean
Church, Gamlingay Heath, Cambridgeshire: 1885
Mission Church of All Saints, Trythall, Gulval, Cornwall: 1885

After 1885, in partnership with Henry J Wadling

St Sylvester's Church, Tetworth, Huntingdonshire: 1886
Muntham, Itchingfield, Sussex: for Marquess of Bath, 1887
St Matthew's Church, Moulmein, Burma: 1887
St Peter-in-Ely, Ely, Cambridgeshire: 1890
St Peter's Church, Sheringham, Norfolk: 1895, completed by Henry Wadling after his death
St Margaret's Church, Halstead, Kent: north aisle and vestry, 1897

Date unknown
Anstie House, Cornwall
St Barnabas's Church, Devonport, Devon

Church restorations listed by counties chronologically
Bedfordshire: Ampthill, 1877

Buckinghamshire: Weston Turville, 1879; Marsh Gibbon, 1879–80; Maids Moreton, 1882–87; Stone, 1883–90

Cambridgeshire: Soham, 1879–80; Gamlingay, 1880–81; Castle Camps, 1882; Little Abington, 1885; Little Gransden, 1885–88; Teversham, 1888–92

Cornwall: Sennen, 1847; St Agnes, 1848; Godolphin, 1849–51; Mawgan-in-Meneage, 1855; Kenwyn, 1860–62; Lesnewth, 1862–65; Lanivet, 1865; Egloshayle, 1867; St Keyne, 1868–77; Minster, 1869–71; Tintagel, 1870; St Anne's Church, Hessenford, 1870–71; St Minver, 1870–75; Tuckingmill, 1875–79; St Breock, 1880–82; St Piran's Church, Perranarworthal, 1884; Ludgvan, 1887–88; Mevagissey, 1887–88; Stratton (1888); Werrington (at the time in Devon), 1891; St Germans, 1891–93; Gulval, 1892; Callington, date unknown; St Issey, date unknown; Mabe date unknown (after 1866). St Aubyn's work always included a footscraper outside the porches: John Betjeman knew this and often failed to visit churches where these could be found.

Derbyshire: Duffield, 1846; St Andrew's Church, Cubley, 1872–74

Devon: Stoke Fleming, 1871; Dawlish, 1874; St. Giles-on-the-Heath, 1878

Gloucestershire: Daglingworth, 1845–51; Church of All Hallows, South Cerney, 1861–62; Standish, 1867; Owlpen, 1874–75; Dursley, 1888–89

Hampshire: Sherborne St John, 1854, 1866–84

Herefordshire: Cusop, date unknown

Kent: Cliffe, 1864; Boughton-under-Blean, 1871; Lympne, 1878–80; Harbledown, 1880; Sheldwich, 1888

Leicestershire: Whitwick, 1848–50; Holy Trinity, Ashby-de-la-Zouch, 1866; Ashby Parva, 1866; Appleby Magna, 1870–72; St Helen, Ashby-de-la-Zouch, 1878–80

Lincolnshire: Theddlethorpe All Saints, 1885

Northamptonshire: Maidwell, 1891

Nottinghamshire: Eakring, 1880–81

Suffolk: Little Glemham, 1857–58; Woolverstone, 1888–89; Sternfield, date unknown

Surrey: Addington, 1876

References

 The Builder, 18 May 1895, p. 380
 Building News, 31 January 1890, p. 186
 RIBA Journal, vol. 2, pp. 653–4 (1895)

1815 births
1895 deaths
19th-century English architects
Architects from Cornwall
Architects from Worcestershire
Architects of cathedrals
Burials in Cornwall
English ecclesiastical architects
Gothic Revival architects
People from Malvern Hills District
People from Marazion